Malinovka is the name of several rural localities in Russia:
Malinovka, Aleysky District, Altai Krai, a selo in Malinovsky Selsoviet of Aleysky District
Malinovka, Bureysky District, Amur Oblast, a selo in Malinovsky Selsoviet of Bureysky District

See also 

 Malinovka River (disambiguation)
 Malinovka (disambiguation)